Carlo Ascenzi (Rome, 17th century) was an Italian painter, active in a Baroque style.

Biography
He was a pupil of Pietro da Cortona. He was a member of the Academy of San Luca and of the Association of the Virtuosi of the Pantheon. He painted a large canvas depicting St Nicola and the Virgin for the church of San Nicola of Genazzano. He also painted for the ceiling of San Carlo al Corso in Rome.

References

17th-century Italian painters
Italian male painters
Painters from Rome
Italian Baroque painters